Jeff is the ninth studio album by guitarist Jeff Beck, released on 5 August 2003 through Epic Records. The album reached No. 92 on the French albums chart and No. 122 on the U.S. Billboard 200. "Plan B" won the award for Best Rock Instrumental Performance at the 2004 Grammys.

Track listing

Personnel

Jeff Beck – guitar, mixing (track 13), production (track 12)
Saffron – vocals (track 3)
Andy Wright – vocals (track 3), engineering (tracks 3–5, 11–13), production (tracks 3–5, 11, 12)
Ronni Ancona – vocals (track 4)
Nancy Sorrell – vocals (tracks 6, 7, 11)
Apollo 440 – vocals (track 6), engineering (tracks 6, 7), production (tracks 6, 7)
Baylen Leonard – vocals (track 7)
The Beeched Boys – vocals (track 7)
Me One – vocals (track 10), mixing (track 10), production (track 10)
Wil Malone – orchestration arrangement (tracks 4, 12)
London Session Orchestra – orchestration (tracks 12, 13)
Steve Barney – drums (tracks 2, 3, 4, 5, 8, 11)
Paul Kodish – drums (track 7)
Technical
Dean Garcia – engineering (tracks 1, 9), mixing (tracks 1, 9), production (tracks 1, 9)
Dave Bloor – engineering (tracks 3–5, 11, 13)
James Brown – engineering (tracks 3–5, 11)
Jamie Maher – engineering (track 10), mixing (track 10)
John Hudson – additional engineering (tracks 4, 13), additional mixing (track 13)
Ferg Peterkin – engineering assistance (tracks 3–5, 11–13)
Ashley Krajewski – engineering assistance (tracks 6, 7)
David Torn – mixing (tracks 2, 8), production (tracks 2, 8)
Michael Barbiero – mixing (tracks 3–5, 11–13)
Howard Gray – mixing (tracks 6, 7)
Tony Hymas – mixing (track 13)

Chart performance

Awards

References

External links
In Review: Jeff Beck "Jeff" at Guitar Nine Records

Jeff Beck albums
2003 albums
Epic Records albums
Grammy Award for Best Rock Instrumental Performance